Gertrude Gollner-Kolar (23 January 1926 – 22 December 2014) was an Austrian artistic gymnast. She competed at the 1948 and 1952 Summer Olympics. At the 1950 Artistic Gymnastics World Championships, she won an uneven bars gold medal along with Ann-Sofi Pettersson of Sweden; Kolar also won the silver medal on vault and the bronze medal in the individual all-around.

Kolar died on 22 December 2014. She was 88.

References

1926 births
2014 deaths
Austrian female artistic gymnasts
Gymnasts at the 1948 Summer Olympics
Gymnasts at the 1952 Summer Olympics
Olympic gymnasts of Austria
World champion gymnasts
20th-century Austrian women